Mercury(II) iodide is a chemical compound with the molecular formula HgI2. It is typically produced synthetically but can also be found in nature as the extremely rare mineral coccinite. Unlike the related mercury(II) chloride it is hardly soluble in water (<100 ppm).

Production
Mercury(II) iodide is produced by adding an aqueous solution of potassium iodide to an aqueous solution of mercury(II) chloride with stirring; the precipitate is filtered off, washed and dried at 70 °C.

 HgCl2 + 2 KI → HgI2 + 2 KCl

Properties
Mercury(II) iodide displays thermochromism; when heated above 126 °C (400 K) it undergoes a phase transition, from the red alpha crystalline form to a pale yellow beta form. As the sample cools, it gradually reacquires its original colour. It has often been used for thermochromism demonstrations. A third form, which is orange, is also known; this can be formed by recrystallisation and is also metastable, eventually converting back to the red alpha form. The various forms can exist in a diverse range of crystal structures and as a result mercury(II) iodide possesses a surprisingly complex phase diagram.

Uses
Mercury(II) iodide is used for preparation of Nessler's reagent, used for detection of presence of ammonia.

Mercury(II) iodide is a semiconductor material, used in some x-ray and gamma ray detection and imaging devices operating at room temperatures.

In veterinary medicine, mercury(II) iodide is used in blister ointments in exostoses, bursal enlargement, etc. 

It can appear as a precipitate in many reactions.

See also

Mercury(I) iodide, Hg2I2

References

Iodides
Metal halides
Mercury(II) compounds
Semiconductor materials